Makowica  is a village in the administrative district of Gmina Limanowa, within Limanowa County, Lesser Poland Voivodeship, in southern Poland.

The village has a population of 234.

References

Makowica